The 2009 UCI Road World Championships were held in Mendrisio, Switzerland, between September 23 and September 27, 2009. The event consisted of a road race and a time trial for men, women and men under 23.

Qualification

Schedule

Individual time trials
Wednesday 23 September 2009
 09:30 - 12:45     Men U23, 33.2 km
 14:00 - 17:15     Women, 26.8 km
Thursday 24 September 2009
 11:30 - 17:00     Men Elite, 49.8 km

Road race
Saturday 26 September 2009
 09:00 - 12:30     Women, 124.2 km
 13:30 - 18:00     Men U23, 179.4 km
Sunday 27 September 2009
 10:30 - 17:30     Men Elite, 262.2 km

Participating nations
Cyclists from 60 national federations participated. The number of cyclists per nation that competed is shown in parentheses.

Events summary

Medal table

References

External links

 
 

 
UCI Road World Championships by year
World Championships
World Championships
International cycle races hosted by Switzerland
Mendrisio